Fairwinds is a settlement in British Columbia in Canada.

It contains the Dolphin Beach Resort and is near the city of Parksville. As of 2016, according to the Canadian Census, Fairwinds had a population of 1,147.

External links
Fairwinds website, retrieved 16 April 2021
maptrove map, retrieved 16 April 2021

Populated places in the Regional District of Nanaimo